Taphrina bullata is an ascomycete fungus that is a plant pathogen. It causes leaf blisters on pear trees.

References

Fungal tree pathogens and diseases
Pear tree diseases
Taphrinomycetes
Fungi described in 1866
Taxa named by Miles Joseph Berkeley
Taxa named by Christopher Edmund Broome